The  was an official who served as effective foreign minister of the Byzantine Empire, in the period from  to , after which it continued as an honorific dignity. The office evolved from the Komnenian-era , and was established during the Empire of Nicaea. Its holders were frequently distinguished scholars, who played a prominent role in the civil and military affairs of their time; three of its holders also served in tandem as the head of the civil administration and effective prime minister of the Empire. The title was also used in the Empire of Trebizond. After the fall of Constantinople, it was adopted in the Danubian Principalities as an honorific title for laymen in the Ecumenical Patriarchate of Constantinople.

History and functions
The all-powerful  Theodore Kastamonites, maternal uncle and de facto regent of the Empire during the early reign of Isaac II Angelos, was the first to be officially called  in a chrysobull of 1192, although as a honorific rather than an actual new title.

The  was not formally replaced by the designation  until after 1204, in the Empire of Nicaea (1204–1261) and under the revived Byzantine Empire under the Palaiologos dynasty (1261–1453).

Pseudo-Kodinos wrote shortly after the middle of the 14th century, but the situation he records is likely of even earlier date.

It appears that the rank retained this high position for the remainder of the Byzantine Empire's existence.

According to pseudo-Kodinos, the insignia of office were a rich silk  (a kaftan-like tunic), a golden-red brimmed hat decorated with embroideries in the  style, without veil, or a domed  hat, again in red and gold and decorated with golden wire, with a portrait of the emperor standing in front, and another of him enthroned in the rear. Unlike most officials of the court, he bore no staff of office (dikanikion).

Following the Fall of Constantinople in 1453, the title was used in the Danubian principalities of Moldavia and Wallachia. In the former, the Great Logothete was the chief minister of the prince and head of the chancellery, while in Wallachia, he was the second-most senior member of the prince's council, after the ban. To this day, the leading rank among the lay archons of the Ecumenical Patriarchate of Constantinople bears the title of "Grand Logothete".

List of known

Empire of Nicaea and Palaiologan period

Empire of Trebizond

Footnotes

References

Sources

 
 
 
 
 
 

Byzantine administrative offices
Heads of government
Lists of office-holders in the Byzantine Empire
Logothetes